This is a list of the presidents of the Chamber of Deputies of Italy from the Kingdom of Sardinia to present. The president is the presiding officer of the Chamber of Deputies and also serves as presiding officer of joint sessions of the Italian Parliament, when the Chamber of Deputies and the Senate vote together.

The president is the speaker of the lower house of the Italian Parliament, the Chamber of Deputies. It is the third highest-ranking office of the Republic of Italy, after the president of the republic and the president of the Senate. Since 14 October 2022, the role has been held by Lorenzo Fontana, who was elected on the fourth vote with an absolute majority of the voting members.

Kingdom of Sardinia (1848–1860)
 Parties

Kingdom of Italy (1861–1946)
 Parties
1861–1912:

1912–1924:

1924–1943:

1943–1946:

Italian Republic (1946–present)
 Parties
1946–1994:

1994–present:

Timeline

Kingdom of Italy (1861–1946)

Italian Republic (1946–present)

See also
Chamber of Deputies (Italy)
List of presidents of the Senate of the Republic (Italy)

Chamber of Deputies, Presidents from the Kingdom of Sardinia
Chamber Of Deputies, Presidents
Presidents